Anísio da Rocha (born 13 October 1912, date of death unknown) was a Brazilian modern pentathlete and equestrian. He competed in the modern pentathlon at the 1936 Summer Olympics and in the equestrian at the 1948 Summer Olympics.

References

External links
 

 

1912 births
Year of death missing
Brazilian male equestrians
Brazilian male modern pentathletes
Olympic equestrians of Brazil
Olympic modern pentathletes of Brazil
Equestrians at the 1948 Summer Olympics
Modern pentathletes at the 1936 Summer Olympics
20th-century Brazilian people